William Henry Thompson (December 14, 1853June 6, 1937) was a Nebraska Democratic Party politician.

Biography
Born in Perrysville, Ohio, he attended  Upper Iowa University in Fayette, Iowa from 1872 to 1875, then graduated from the University of Iowa law school in 1877, being admitted to the bar the same year. He started practicing law in what was then known as Brush Creek, Iowa, but is now known as Arlington, Iowa.  He moved to Grand Island, Nebraska in 1881, practiced law and did some banking as well.

He became Grand Island's city attorney from 1887 to 1888, then ran and lost in becoming a congressman from Nebraska to the 52nd congress in 1890. He was a member of the board of trustees for Grand Island College in 1893, and was elected mayor of Grand Island serving from 1895 to 1898. He was a member of the Democratic National Committee from 1896 to 1900 and again from  1920 to 1924.

In 1902 he ran, unsuccessfully, for governor against John H. Mickey. He became a member of the commission for the creation of a new capital. He was an associate justice of the Nebraska Supreme Court from 1924 to 1931. He was appointed on May 24, 1933, by then governor Charles W. Bryan, brother to democratic presidential candidate William Jennings Bryan, to fill the senate seat of Robert B. Howell when he died. Richard C. Hunter was elected to replace him.

Thompson died in Grand Island, Nebraska, on June 6, 1937, and interment in Grand Island Cemetery.

References

External links
 

1853 births
1937 deaths
People from Perrysville, Ohio
Democratic Party United States senators from Nebraska
Nebraska Democrats
Justices of the Nebraska Supreme Court
Nebraska state court judges
Mayors of places in Nebraska
People from Grand Island, Nebraska
Nebraska lawyers
University of Iowa College of Law alumni